Tullio Martello (13 March 1841 – 10 February 1918) was an Italian economist.

He took part in the Expedition of the Thousand.

Works

Bibliography 
 
 

1841 births
1918 deaths
Italian economists
Members of the Expedition of the Thousand